Big Squaw Mountain Resort is a ski area in Greenville, Maine. 
Opened in 1963, the ski area is located on the north side of Big Moose Mountain (named "Big Squaw Mountain" until 2000), overlooking Moosehead Lake.  The resort featured two chairlifts that covered 1,700 vertical feet.

After a chairlift accident and subsequent closure, the ski area operated on a limited basis from 2004 to 2010.

A community group non-profit called "Friends of Squaw Mountain" was later formed and renovated the ski park. The group currently operates the resort.

External links 
  Big Squaw - New England Lost Ski Areas Project
  Squaw Mountain - NewEnglandSkiHistory.com
  Friends of Squaw Mountain - working to reopen the ski area for 2012-2013
 Big Squaw Mountain Ski Resort

Ski areas and resorts in Maine
Buildings and structures in Piscataquis County, Maine
Tourist attractions in Piscataquis County, Maine